It's Hard to be Nice (Original title in Bosnian: Teško je biti fin) is a 2007 Bosnian film by Srđan Vuletić. The movie is about a man who lives in a challenging, post-war Bosnia and Herzegovina where many are forced to create their own destinies. Fudo, a taxi driver who lives in Sarajevo with his wife and a newborn baby, is pressured by his wife to turn his life around from being associated with local and regional mafia.  He firmly adheres and acts to change to an honest family man bound by goodness and peace. However, the challenging events that follow bring his family and his life to a severe test.

Cast
Saša Petrović as Fudo
Daria Lorenci as Azra
Emir Hadžihafizbegović as Sejo
Senad Bašić as Bato
Aleksandar Seksan as Mrki
Jasna Žalica as Nurse
Izudin Bajrović as Doctor
Damir Savić as Beba
Miraj Grbić as Receptionist

Awards and nominations
The Heart of Sarajevo for the Best Actor (Saša Petrović) - Sarajevo Film Festival - 2007

External links
Teško je biti fin at the Internet Movie Database

2007 films
Bosnia and Herzegovina drama films
Bosnian-language films